Lionel Albert is a businessperson, writer, and political activist in the Canadian province of Quebec. He is best known for his opposition to Quebec's language laws.

Background and private career

Albert is of Lithuanian Jewish background. His grandfather, Simon Albert, moved to Canada following a regional pogrom in 1905.

A computer analyst in private life, Albert lived in Outremont, Montreal for many years before moving to Knowlton in the Eastern Townships.

Cultural politics in Quebec

Albert is a vocal critic of Quebec's Charter of the French Language (otherwise known as Bill 101) and of Quebec nationalism in general. He argues that the Charter of the French Language violates the rights of Quebec anglophones, and he blames nationalist policies pursued by the Quebec government since 1962 for prompting anglophones to leave the province. He has also written that the French language is not under threat in Quebec and that the province would be more successful economically if it dropped its nationalist focus.

Albert is an ally of William Shaw, a longtime right-wing anglophone activist in Quebec and a former Member of the National Assembly (1976–81). Shaw and Albert wrote a book entitled, Partition - The Price of Quebec's Independence, in 1980, arguing that Quebec could and should be partitioned if it ever declares independence. (Specifically, they argue that the far north should be retained by Canada outright, and that the Outaouais, Abitibi-Témiscamingue, most of Montreal, the territory to the south of the Saint Lawrence River, and some borderlands with Labrador would likely remain in Canada following negotiations). Shaw and Albert also suggest that separation will never happen, on the grounds that nationalist francophone Quebecers have used the threat of separation to extract concessions from the federal government but recognize actual independence would harm their community. They further argue that French Canadians inside and outside Quebec are a distinct group with the right of self-determination, but that residents of the province of Quebec are not.

Albert has continued to express these and similar opinions since Partition'''s publication. In 1990, for instance, he argued that English Canadians were taking the threat of separatism too seriously. In a public debate in 1994, he suggested that Quebec should be partitioned to prevent more anglophone youth from leaving the province.

Albert's criticisms of Quebec nationalism have sometimes provoked controversy. In early 1990, he wrote a piece in the Montreal paper The Suburban comparing Quebec’s language legislation to Nazism. (When Michael Crelinsten of the Canadian Jewish Congress objected to this analogy, Albert responded by attacking Crelinsten in print.) In the same period, Albert wrote another piece for The Suburban suggesting that francophone Quebecers were "country people" and that anglophone Quebecers were "city people." The paper later apologized for Albert's articles.

Political activism

In 1976, Albert became active with an organization called "The Preparatory Committee for an Eleventh Province". He has acknowledged that his primary concern was to remove language restrictions from anglophone Quebecers.

Albert joined the executive of the Equality Party of Quebec, which was focused on anglophone rights, shortly after its founding in 1989. When speaking at a party rally that year, he argued that the government of Canada could be justified in sending the Canadian Army into Quebec because of threats to the anglophone minority. A Montreal Gazette'' article subsequently described Albert as belonging to a "redneck anglo-rights fringe" distinct from more mainstream supporters of anglophone rights. Equality Party leader Robert Libman also clarified that Albert’s views were not those of the party. For his part, Albert later said that he did not favour sending federal troops to Quebec, but believed that the federal government should act with "all the force at its command" to protect what he described as threats to a minority culture.

In the 1993 Canadian federal election, Albert ran as a candidate of the unregistered Equality Party of Canada, which was aligned with the provincial party. During this campaign, he was quoted as saying, "The anglo minority in Quebec is just not represented in the House of Commons." He finished well behind Liberal candidate Bernard Patry.

Albert joined the Reform Party of Canada after the 1993 election. He attended the party’s 1994 convention and supported its call for an end to Canada’s Official Languages Act. He later criticized the Canadian Alliance, a successor party to Reform, for working too closely with Quebec nationalists.

In the 2003 Quebec provincial election, Albert ran for the Equality Party in Brome—Missisquoi. He again focused on language issues, saying that incumbent Liberal representative Pierre Paradis had not defended the rights of local anglophones. The Equality Party was nearly moribund in this period; on election day, Albert received less than one per cent of the vote.

In the 2008 Canadian federal election, he supported Conservative candidate Mark Quinlan.

Other views

Albert is a prolific writer of opinion columns and public letters on diverse subjects. Among other things, he written against the metric system, criticized Pete Seeger as a communist propagandist, praised Chilean dictator Augusto Pinochet, defended Monsanto, and supported the 2003 invasion of Iraq. During the 2004 American presidential election, Albert attempted to counter the perception that George W. Bush received support from less intelligent American voters. His public letter on this subject included the statement, "Bush leads 55-42 among whites while Kerry leads 82-12 among blacks, who on average are less educated."

He is also opposed to abortion. In 1992, he wrote a piece comparing abortion care providers  with hangmen.

Albert has written that he is not a Zionist.

Electoral record
Federal

Provincial

References

Living people
Independent candidates for the Canadian House of Commons
Year of birth missing (living people)